John Armand Lafore Jr. (May 25, 1905 – January 24, 1993) was an American politician who was a Republican member of the U.S. House of Representatives from Pennsylvania. He was also president of the American Kennel Club.

Biography
Lafore was born in Bala, Pennsylvania on May 25, 1905.  He was a student at Swarthmore College in 1923 and 1925 and the University of Pennsylvania in 1925 and 1926. One of his brothers, Laurence Lafore, became known for his work as an American historian.

He was an automobile dealer in Philadelphia, Pennsylvania, from 1932 to 1957.  He was the comptroller of Montgomery County, and chairman of the Lower Merion Township Committee.  He served as a lieutenant commander in the United States Navy from 1942 to 1945.

Lafore was a member of the Pennsylvania State House of Representatives from 1950 to 1957.  He was elected as a Republican to the 85th Congress to fill the vacancy left by the resignation of Samuel K. McConnell Jr.  He was reelected to the 86th Congress, but was an unsuccessful candidate for renomination in 1960. Lafore voted in favor of the Civil Rights Act of 1960.

After his time in Congress, Lafore was the president of an aircraft company in Willow Grove, Pennsylvania, from 1961 to 1964, and as vice president of Day and Zimmerman of Philadelphia from 1965 to 1966.

Lafore served as executive vice president of the American Kennel Club from 1968 to 1971 and president from 1971 to 1979. He died on  January 24, 1993.  Mr. Lafore was an ardent breeder and fancier of both Keeshonden and Collies during his lifetime.

Sources

Republican Party members of the Pennsylvania House of Representatives
University of Pennsylvania alumni
1905 births
1993 deaths
American automobile salespeople
Swarthmore College alumni
Republican Party members of the United States House of Representatives from Pennsylvania
20th-century American politicians